Carl Helsted  (4 January 1818 – 7 June 1904) was a Danish composer. Nina Grieg studied voice with Helsted.

See also
List of Danish composers

References
This article was initially translated from the Danish Wikipedia.

Danish composers
Male composers
1818 births
1904 deaths
19th-century male musicians